Taja Zai is a town and union council of Lakki Marwat District in Khyber Pakhtunkhwa province of Pakistan. It is at 32°41'42N 70°46'25E and has an elevation of 274 metres (902 feet).

References

Union councils of Lakki Marwat District
Populated places in Lakki Marwat District